Badinabad may refer to:
 Badinabad-e Mangur
 Badinabad-e Piran